The Swiss national football team represents the nation of Switzerland in international association football. It is fielded by the Swiss Football Association, the governing body of football in Switzerland, and competes as a member of the Union of European Football Associations (UEFA), which encompasses the countries of Europe. The team played its first official international match on 12 February 1905 against France.

List
Appearances and goals are composed of FIFA World Cup and UEFA European Championship matches and each competition's required qualification matches, as well as UEFA Nations League matches, FIFA Confederations Cup matches and numerous international friendly tournaments and matches.

Caps and goals updated as of 6 December 2022

See also
:Category:Switzerland international footballers
Current Squad

References

 
Association football player non-biographical articles